Margaret Court Arena is a multi-purpose sports and entertainment venue located in Melbourne Park in Melbourne, Victoria, Australia. The arena, which was built in 1987 and redeveloped in the mid-2010s, has a capacity of 7,500.

History
Originally named Show Court One, the venue was opened in 1988, the year the Australian Open tennis championships moved from Kooyong Lawn Tennis Club to Melbourne Park. The show court had a capacity of 6,000 people and was renamed to Margaret Court Arena in early 2003, as a tribute to Australia’s most successful female tennis player.

Redevelopment

In response to the issue of recurring heatwaves at the Australian Open, as well as a demand for a smaller multi-purpose stadium in the city, the Victorian Government announced in January 2010 a redevelopment plan for Margaret Court Arena, to occur in tandem with a broader upgrade to the Melbourne Park precinct, at a total cost of $363 million. Lend Lease Group was awarded the tender in October 2011, at which point the Government announced the cost of the upgrade to the arena exclusively; $180 million. Construction of the arena began in March 2012 and was undertaken by NH Architecture and Populous.

The redevelopment made the arena the third in the precinct to have a retractable roof and increased the stadium capacity from 6,000 to 7,500 seats. The redevelopment was completed in January 2015, prior to that month's Australian Open. The arena is the third largest capacity venue at the Australian Open tournament, behind the 15,000 capacity Rod Laver Arena (centre court) and the 10,500 seat John Cain Arena.

Sports and events
 The arena has hosted tennis matches at the Australian Open every year since 1988. Since the redevelopment in 2014, the arena has increasingly been used for sports such as basketball and netball, as well as musical concerts.

Professional netball clubs the Melbourne Vixens and Collingwood Magpies play some home matches at Margaret Court Arena, typically when the adjacent John Cain Arena is unavailable. The Vixens announced their intention to move home games to the venue in March 2013, stating that the "redeveloped venue is going to be fantastic for us for at least the next five years." In netball mode, the venue can be configured to hold either 5000 people in its bottom tier or 7500 when both sections are open. The Australia national netball team have also hosted test matches at the venue.

National Basketball League club Melbourne United played some of their home matches at Margaret Court Arena. The club announced it had signed a "multi-year deal" in August 2014 to split 12 of its 14 home matches at Margaret Court Arena and Melbourne Arena. United played their first home game at the arena on 12 November 2014 and they defeated the Cairns Taipans 91-76 before a crowd of 3,393 fans. The club later shifted all home matches to John Cain Arena.

In addition to being able to host various sporting events, Margaret Court Arena also hosts a number of concerts, ensuring Melbourne has a third indoor entertainment venue, all of which are located within Melbourne Park and feature retractable roofing. The arena has played host to artists such as Bob Dylan, Cloud Control, The Black Keys, Delta Goodrem, Demi Lovato, Hilltop Hoods, Macklemore & Ryan Lewis, Selena Gomez, Imagine Dragons, 5 Seconds of Summer, Angus & Julia Stone, Little Mix, The B-52s and many more. The venue has a capacity of 6,500 for concerts though has the flexibility to downsize for smaller events.

Naming controversy
The name of the arena, which recognises one of the most successful female tennis players, Margaret Court, has attracted debate over Court's views regarding LGBT issues. In May 2017, an open letter by Court was published in The West Australian, addressed to the board of Qantas and its CEO Alan Joyce. In it, Court declared her intention to boycott the airline (where possible) over it having "become an active promoter for same-sex marriage."  Joyce has advocated for same-sex marriage, writing that "[s]ame-sex marriage isn't a niche issue. It's about basic rights and equality – the 'fair go' that's such a fundamental Australian value." Court has been a critic of homosexuality and gender identity for several decades and is quoted as saying that the presence of "LGBT (sic) in the schools, it's the devil, it's not of God". Various campaigns have been instigated to change the name of the arena. Whilst some former tennis players such as Martina Navratilova and John McEnroe have staged on-court protests over the name of the arena, other public figures such as former Prime Minister Malcolm Turnbull have opposed these efforts on the basis that the arena "celebrates Margaret Court the tennis player" and not her personal beliefs. Venue management has previously stated that it does not support Court's comments and "embrace[s] equality, diversity and inclusion".

Awards
 Public Architecture Award (Alterations and Additions) — 2015 Australian Institute of Architecture Victorian Awards

See also

List of sports venues named after individuals
List of tennis stadiums by capacity
List of indoor arenas in Australia

References

External links
 Official website
 Margaret Court Arena — Crowd Records at the Venue (Not Including Australian Open)
 

Sports venues in Melbourne
Tennis venues in Australia
Defunct National Basketball League (Australia) venues
Basketball venues in Australia
Netball venues in Victoria (Australia)
Retractable-roof stadiums in Australia
Melbourne United
Melbourne Vixens
Collingwood Magpies Netball
Sports venues completed in 1988
Indoor arenas in Australia
Sport in the City of Melbourne (LGA)
Buildings and structures in the City of Melbourne (LGA)